F. elegans may refer to:
 Festuca elegans, a grass species in the genus Festuca
 Fossarus elegans, a sea snail species

Synonyms 
 Fulgora elegans, a synonym for Calyptoproctus elegans, a bug in the family Fulgoridae found in Surinam, Brazil, French Guiana and Honduras